'Macoun' apples are a cross between the 'McIntosh' and 'Jersey Black' cultivars. The Macoun ("Ma-cown," after the variety's namesake, Canadian horticulturalist W.T. Macoun, but sometimes also pronounced either "Ma-coon" or "McCowan") was developed at the New York State Agricultural Experiment Station in Geneva, by Richard Wellington. It was first introduced in 1932, and is an eating apple. This apple is excellent for making European style apple pies because it doesn't break down during cooking and remains firm.  Macouns are also very popular at roadside stands and pick-your-own farms. Availability is generally October through November. Sugar 13%, acid 6g/litre, vitamin C 4mg/100g.

Aside from its short season of availability, the popularity of the apple is compromised by the problems it gives orchardists. The 'Macoun' has a short stem, and there is a tendency for the apple to push itself off the branch as the fruit matures; also, the 'Macoun' tends not to produce reliable crops each year, with a good harvest followed by a sparser one.

The patent application for the 'Honeycrisp' apple stated that it was descended from 'Macoun' crossed with 'Honeygold', but this has since been disproved by genetic testing.

The Price look-up code for all sizes of Macoun apples is 3073.

Characteristics 
The skin is a dark red with a purplish flush. Its very firm flesh is juicy and snow white, tasting sweet with a hint of berry.

Disease susceptibility
 Scab: High
 Powdery mildew: High
 Cedar apple rust: High
 Fire blight: Medium

References 

Apple cultivars